Abdalá Jaime  "Dalo" Bucaram Pulley Jr. (born 25 March 1982, in Guayaquil, Ecuador), is an Ecuadorian political figure and former footballer. He is the son of former President Abdalá Bucaram Ortiz.

After his retirement from professional football at age 24, he began his political career by being elected to office, as an Assemblyman with 428,000 votes  in 2009 and in 2014 was re-elected with 500,000.

On December 1, 2014, he announced his resignation from his position as National Assemblyman due to his strong convictions that the office he served did not serve the best interest of his constituents.

On 2017 he ran for the presidency of the republic under the support of his political party  Fuerza Ecuador (FE), founded by him, he lost the election obtaining only 4.82% of the votes.

He was invited to the XIII Latin American Summit of Political Marketing and Governance, event that brings together the leading strategists and political consultants of the world.

Early life 

Abdala "Dalo" Bucaram was born in Guayaquil, Ecuador on March 25, 1982, son of Abdala Bucaram Ortiz and Maria Rosa Pulley Vergara. He is the third of four brothers: James, Linda and Michel.

He completed his high school education at the Moderna Sergio Perez Valdez College in Guayaquil.

As an athlete he was part of one of the two most relevant teams in the country C.S. Emelec where he began his football career. He also played with Barcelona S.C, Santa Rita and Otubrino Daring Nationally.

Internationally he played for teams such as Chacarita Junior (Argentina) and the Alliance of Montevideo in the Uruguayan second division.

Family 

Bucaram's father is Abdalá Bucaram Ortiz, a populist who was President of Ecuador from August 10, 1996, to February 6, 1997, when he was ousted by the Congress of Ecuador for alleged "mental incapacity".

Marriage and sons 

He married in 2005 with TV host an assemblywoman Gabriela Pazmiño, with whom he has four children: Dalia, Maria Gabriela, Abdala and Charlotte.

Education 

Bucaram studied law at the Metropolitan University of Ecuador. Later, he transferred to the Cooperative University of Colombia in Quito where he graduated with a degree in law from the courts of the Republic in 2008.

After graduating as a lawyer, Bucaram specialized in Constitutional Law at the Universidad de Salamanca of Spain in 2013. He continued his studies and pursued a master's degree in Political Management from George Washington University.

Bucaram also fulfilled seminars at the University of Alicante, University of Salamanca, and George Washington University.

Sport career 

As a football player his position was as a midfielder for several clubs in South America.

In 2001, he was selected for the national football team U-20 Ecuador, but only played the opening match of the South American championship. 

After that match against Venezuela ended in a 0–0 score manager José María Burbano resigned and Fabian Andrade took over as coach. Bucaram said a political conspiracy prevented him from being selected for any additional games during the tournament .

In 2003, while playing for Emelec, he participated in the Copa Libertadores. During the tournament he played two games .

Political career

Ecuadorian Roldosista Party 

PRE was a political party led by Bucaram's father Abdala Bucaram Ortiz, founded on 18 January 1983. The younger Bucaram was the provincial director of Guayas from 2006 to 2008, and national director of the party for six years from 2008 to 2013. Bucaram left the party, saying that he wanted to pursue his master's degree, spend more time with his family, and support new leadership in Guayas.

National Constituent Assembly

2009–2013 

Bucaram was first elected to the National Assembly with 428,000 votes for the Ecuadorian Roldosista Party. His wife, Gabriela Pazmiño, ran on the same party list as him, and was chosen as MP for the province of Guayas.

2013–2017 

Bucaram and his wife sought reelection for a second period in the National Assembly, but only Bucaram was reelected with half a million votes, becoming the only Roldosist member in the Assembly.

However, at the beginning of the first debate of the report on a series controversial amendments to the Constitution prepared by the Assembly, Bucaram announced his resignation under the argument that he was against the ultimately-approved changes promoted by the majority block of País Alliance. He also questioned the lack of consultation (via referendum) to the Ecuadorian populace: "they trample the rights of people by not consulting them in a referendum", he said. Additionally, he justified his decision on his conviction that the office he served did not serve the best interest of his constituents.

Presidential bid 

On 10 September 2015 the National Electoral Council approved the political party Fuerza Ecuador which has the No.10 as the electoral distinctive. The party has about 600,000 members nationwide.

In December, at party headquarters in the north of Guayaquil, Bucaram announced his decision to run for the presidency in the 2017 elections, while unveiling the first proposal of his government plan: the elimination of a government-sponsored program for the replacement of gas kitchens with induction kitchens.

Despite being under the focus of criticism for his father's legacy, Bucaram has been clear that although he loves and respects his father, his philosophy and political views are his own and they differ from those of Bucaram Sr.

Controversies 

During his first period as assemblyman (2009–2013), Bucaram was fined with 10% of his monthly salary by the administrative board of the Assembly after being verbally aggressive towards fellow MP Betty Amores and other members of Alianza País.

References

External links 
 

|-

1982 births
Living people
People from Guayaquil
Ecuadorian people of Lebanese descent
Sportspeople of Lebanese descent
Ecuadorian people of Spanish descent
Sportspeople of Spanish descent
Ecuadorian footballers
Ecuadorian expatriate footballers
Colo-Colo footballers
Barcelona S.C. footballers
C.S. Emelec footballers
Santiago Morning footballers
Unión San Felipe footballers
Alianza F.C. footballers
Ecuadorian Serie A players
Chilean Primera División players
Primera B de Chile players
Salvadoran Primera División players
Ecuadorian expatriate sportspeople in Chile
Expatriate footballers in Chile

Expatriate footballers in El Salvador
Ecuadorian sportsperson-politicians
Ecuadorian Roldosist Party politicians
Members of the first National Assembly (Ecuador)
Members of the second National Assembly (Ecuador)
University of Salamanca alumni
Children of national leaders
Association football forwards